Deltostethus is a genus of water scavenger beetles in the family Hydrophilidae. There are at least four described species in Deltostethus.

Species
These four species belong to the genus Deltostethus:
 Deltostethus columbiensis (Hatch, 1965)
 Deltostethus palpalis Sharp, 1882
 Deltostethus scitulus Spangler & Huacuja
 Deltostethus sulcatus Sharp, 1882

References

Further reading

 

Hydrophilidae
Articles created by Qbugbot